Rice production in South Korea is important for the food supply in the country, with rice being a common part of the Korean diet.  In 2009, South Korea produced 3,899,036 metric tonnes (4,297,951 tons) of rice.
Rice is the most valuable crop in South Korea. However, as noted by Donald S. Macdonald, rising wage levels and land values have made it expensive to produce. Rice represented about 90 percent of total grain production and over 40 percent of farm income; the 1988 rice crop was 6.5 million tonnes. Rice was imported in the 1980s, but the amount depended on the success of domestic harvests. The government's rice support program reached a record of US$1.9 billion in 1986 as compared with $890 million in 1985. By raising procurement prices by 14 percent to the 1986 level, Seoul achieved a rice price structure that was about five times that of the world market in 1987.

In 2015, South Korea's rice consumption hit a record low of 65.1 kg per person, while flour consumption was the highest since 2006 at 33.6 kg, according to industry and official data. The South Korean government, which is subsidizing rice production and storage, has accumulated a large stockpile of rice.

Rice Production Status

Rice Production in the Region of Korea

Korea's Famous Rice brand 

Icheon rice

Icheon rice(이천 쌀) is rice produced in Icheon, Gyeonggi-do. Icheon rice is the most preferred product among large retailers and small retailers such as E-Mart, Lotte Mart, and Homeplus. Icheon rice has fewer calories, fat, and protein than other regions, and thiamine, niacin, vitamins, and essential amino acids, which make rice taste better, taste better than other local rice even after March to April of the following year. There are three reasons why Icheon rice tastes good. First, 88% of farmers in Icheon farm underground water. Second, Icheon, Gyeonggi-do, is a basin-type topography located in the center of the inland, and has excellent quality due to the large seasonal temperature difference and daily temperature difference between day and night, and has a good environment for growing rice due to the higher sunlight during the bearing season. Third, fertile soil. This is because the grayish brown clay content due to granite gneiss is high and it is made of decomposed granite soil so water can be controlled well and sufficient nutrition can be supplied until the late stage of growth.

Yeoju rice

Yeoju rice(여주 쌀) is rice produced in Yeoju, Gyeonggi-do. Yeoju rice has obtained a "G mark" that can be obtained only when certified by the governor of Gyeonggi-do. The 'G Mark' is a brand mark given to agricultural products produced in Gyeonggi-do. The reason why Yeoju rice tastes good is that Yeoju is not located in an area greatly affected by drought and flooding, and there are also few high mountains, so the sun shines all day, and the daily temperature difference between day and night is larger than in other areas. Yeoju also has the best water quality because the Namhan River flows in the center. Finally, it can produce high-quality rice because it is produced on land with a lot of organic.

Cheolwon odae rice

Cheolwon Odae(철원오대 쌀) rice is a land produced near the Demilitarized Zone in Cheolwon, Gangwon-do. Rice grains are larger than other rice, and the aging of rice is slow, so the taste can be maintained for a long time. Cheolwon Odae rice has a unique savory and sweet taste. It is also characterized by a white dot next to the grain of rice. It is cultivated in Cheolwon's plain, which is composed of basalt inorganic ocher soil and is rich in nutrition. In addition, Cheolwon has a large daily temperature difference, so it makes sticky rice.

Falling in love at a glance rice

Falling in love at a glance rice(한눈에 반한 쌀) is produced in Haenam, Jeollanam-do. This rice is used to make sushi very well.

The rice was awarded the grand prize in 2006, 2007, and 2009 in the High-Quality Brand Rice Evaluation by the Korea Consumer Organization Council, and was selected as an excellent brand of rice for eight years.

Rice Distribution and Consumption

Korea's Rice Export 

South Korea's major rice exporters are the United States, Australia, and Singapore, accounting for 60 percent of the total exports. As the demand for dining out increased due to the stabilization of COVID-19, the demand for Korean rice from overseas Korean markets such as the United States and Australia decreased.

The U.S. exports about 500 tons annually to Korean marts and Korean restaurants. The demand for Korean food consumption for rice processed foods is increasing due to the popularity of K-contents.

Japan exports about 30 tons a year. As rice processed foods, demand for traditional liquor and Sikhye is increasing.

Vietnam exports about 97 tons of rice annually, and rice processed foods are increasing as entry into the Tteokbokki franchise expands.

Korea's Rice Consumption

1.  Annual consumption of rice per person in the household 
Korea's rice consumption has been decreasing for 37 consecutive years since 1988. Rice consumption per capita in 2021 is 56.9%. This decreased by 1.4% (0.8 kg) compared to 2020.

The reason for the decrease in rice consumption is known to be due to changes in eating habits. This is due to the decrease in the number of people who cook at home, and the spread of the culture of delivering various foods or eating out a lot. However, the Ministry of Agriculture, Food and Rural Affairs of South Korea explains that the extent of the decline in rice consumption last year has eased compared to the previous two years. In fact, last year's 1.4% decrease is less than 3.0% in 2019 and 2.5% in 2020. The first reason for the extent of the decline in rice consumption is the increase in demand for homemade meals due to the expansion of the home convenience market such as soup and stew. And the second is the increase in single-person households with relatively high rice consumption. The third reason is that after COVID-19, there are more people prefer home-cooked meals.

2. Rice consumption in the company 
Rice consumption in the 2021 business sector totaled 680,000 tons, up 30,000 tons (4.6%↑) from 650,000 tons in 2020. By industry, demand for lunch boxes, noodles, rice cakes, and cooked food for meals increased by more than 10% compared to the previous year, and demand for sugar and liquor decreased slightly. In particular, the manufacturing of lunch boxes increased by 16% in 2021 compared to 2020, and the demand for cooked food such as instant rice has been steadily increasing over the past three years.

The Economic Implications of Rice 
Rice is suitable for regions affected by seasonal wind such as Korea, China, Japan, and Southeast Asia, and is one of the highest crops per unit area. In a country with narrow farmland like Korea, it is very efficient to grow crops with high land productivity, such as rice, to solve this food for a large population. For this reason, rice has been inextricably linked to the meaning of food as a staple food and the lives of the Korean people. In addition, the production, distribution, and consumption of rice have become the basis of the economy of the South Korea.

Rice was used in place of money before money was created. When bartering, there were many difficulties in comparing the values of objects and dividing the quantity. To solve this problem, rice which is a daily necessity, was used. There is a record that rice was used as a currency during the reign of King Soji of Silla. This shows that rice was used as a currency even during the period of Three Kingdoms of Korea.

After the currency was created, the monetary function of rice gradually disappeared, but the monetary function of rice remained in rural areas. In the case of paying farm rent between 1965 and 1981, the ratio of payment in kind. paid in rice was 70 to 94%, which greatly exceeded cash expenditure. In particular, rice was a symbol of the wealth of farmers in the process of economic development.

Rice is our most important staple food and also accounts for a large portion of the nation's nutritional supply. In addition, rice is a basic food for the people and accounts for a high proportion of household expenses, so the rise in rice prices is a big pressure on household expenses for people living in cities. Furthermore, it acts as a wage increase factor and eventually causes an increase in general prices. In other words, this suggests that rice should not be too expensive or too cheap. Because if the price of rice is too high, people cannot buy it. On the other hand, if the price of rice is too low, it cannot guarantee the cost of living for farmers who grow rice.

History of Rice Production 
The most likely origin of Asian rice cultivated in Korea is the theory of the origin of Assam in northern India, and there are other theories of the origin of Yunnan in southern China and Southeast Asia. However, the recent excavation of rice seeds from the earthen layer of the Paleolithic Age in Sorori, Chungcheingbuk-do, Korea, has raised new interest in the origin of rice and its propagation route

Before the ancestors of the Republic of Korea ate rice, they ate mixed grains as a staple food. As rice entered Korea through the north, it was actively grown in Yeongnam and Honam regions, which have favorable climate conditions. Rice production in Baekje and Silla was high during the Three Kingdoms of Korea, and rice topped the list of staple foods, especially during the Unified Silla Period. Rice in Korea is weak against falling and rice blasts, but it is resistant to cold and grows well even if there is insufficient water to suit our climate.

As a result, rice cultivation became common in the Goryeo Dynasty, and rice cultivation was strengthened by making rice warehouses, improving cultivation methods, and expanding agricultural areas. As the population increased and the preference for rice increased, the production of rice became more necessary than in the past. During the Joseon Dynasty, rice planting methods spread throughout the country, increasing the amount of rice production.

By the late Joseon Dynasty, farmers cultivated superior species. There were about 1,500 varieties of rice in South Korea. However, due to the policy of abolishing traditional rice during the Japanese colonial era and accepting Japanese rice varieties, only 55 species remained in 1935. And the harvest of rice decreased in 1978 due to damages by blight and harmful insects and cold weather damage. However, Korea was able to achieve substantial self-sufficiency in rice after the mid-1980s due to the technology developed in the development and distribution of Tongil Rice.

Storage of Rice

Rice Storage Methods in Korea 

The Korea Rural Development Administration introduced a rice storage method that can reduce changes in the proper temperature and quality to keep rice fresh.

Since rice reacts sensitively to the outside temperature, it should be stored in an appropriate way to reduce quality changes. If the temperature of the place where rice is stored is high, the fat contained in the rice is combined with oxygen in the air, raising the acidity, and smelling, and deteriorating the taste of rice. In an experiment conducted by the Korea Rural Development Administration to examine changes in rice quality according to storage temperature, rice stored at 4 degrees Celsius was found to last the longest due to low changes in rice taste, freshness, and color.

In general households, it is best to store rice in an airtight container in the refrigerator. If the situation is not possible, it is recommended to store it in a cool place where there is no sunlight until October to April, when the average temperature is less than 15 degrees. If you have no choice but to store it at room temperature in summer, it is better to purchase small amounts of rice and consume it as soon as possible. On the contrary, if the temperature drops below zero in winter, the rice may freeze, increasing the volume of moisture and cracking, so be careful.

It is recommended to store it in an airtight container because moisture may drop, and the taste may drop if it comes into contact with external air. In particular, in summer when humidity and temperature are high, microorganisms such as pests, fungi, and bacteria can occur, so they should be stored in a cool and low-humidity place.

In Korean homes, kimchi is usually stored at an appropriate temperature using a kimchi refrigerator. The reason why kimchi refrigerators are in the spotlight is that when kimchi is finished, kimchi should be put in a jar and buried in the ground, but as the number of cities increases and the number of people living in apartments other than detached houses increases, housewives who cannot use the past storage method chose it as a substitute. In Korea, kimchi refrigerators are treated as necessities in the home, so you can see that the kitchen's refrigerator space is assumed and explained as two in a video introducing various new buildings.

Public Stockpiling System in Korea 
The public storage system is the Korean government's system that stores a certain amount of food in case of food crises such as unstable grain supply and demand, natural disasters, and war. It reserves 17-18% of annual consumption, and purchases from farmers at the national average rice price during the harvest season from October to December. In principle, the stockpile is supplied throughout the year through the military and government offices to circulate inventory, and if supply and demand are unstable, it is released to the market at a short sale price. Replacement of a certain quantity every year to prevent rapid quality degradation due to the lapse of the storage period and to ensure smooth inventory circulation

See also 
Paddy fields in Korea
Agriculture in South Korea
Wild rice
Rice production of Japan
Rice in Korean culture

References

Agriculture in South Korea
South Korea